R.B.I. Baseball is a baseball sports video game series. R.B.I. stands for"run batted in.  Launched in 1987 as a localized version of Namco's Family Stadium series, the R.B.I. Baseball series initially ran through 1995. In 2014, the series was rebooted as a competitor to MLB: The Show, with releases each year until its cancellation. The series was ended in 2022 with the release of MLB The Show 22 on the Nintendo Switch.

History

Namco developed and released Pro Yakyū: Family Stadium (Pro Baseball: Family Stadium) for the Family Computer (Famicom), the first game in their Family Stadium series, on December 10, 1986. Pro Baseball: Family Stadium was created by Namco programmer Yoshihiro Kishimoto, who had previously worked on games such as Baraduke (1985).

Atari Games released a Nintendo VS. System arcade machine of Family Stadium named Atari R.B.I. Baseball in 1987. Atari programmer Peter Lipson adapted Family Stadium into the American localized version R.B.I. Baseball for the NES, which was published by Atari Games subsidiary Tengen. Subsequent editions were published until 1995, mostly on Sega systems.

In 2014, Major League Baseball Advanced Media, the digital arm of MLB, revived the name for a new series of MLB games featuring arcade-style gameplay influenced by the original series. The new series, which had annual releases, was made available on multiple platforms. The series was meant to contrast the Sony-published and formerly PlayStation-exclusive MLB The Show, which is considered more simulationist in its focus. In 2022, the series was cancelled due to the release of MLB The Show 22 on the Nintendo Switch.

Gameplay

RBI Baseball was the first console game of its kind to be licensed by the Major League Baseball Players Association (MLBPA) and used actual MLB player names, unlike other baseball video games of the late 1980s. As it was not licensed by Major League Baseball (MLB) itself, it did not use team nicknames or logos. The game also boasted two All-Star teams, American League and National League; the two featured established veterans such as George Brett, Mike Schmidt, Dale Murphy and Andre Dawson—none of whom appeared on the other eight teams—and up-and-coming players like Mark McGwire, Andrés Galarraga, Kevin Seitzer and José Canseco.

Each player has different capabilities in the game; hitters vary in ability to make solid contact, to hit the ball with power, and their base running speed. Vince Coleman is the fastest player in the game; it is very difficult to catch him stealing second base. Pitchers vary in pitching speed, and the amount by which the player can steer the ball left and right during its flight. Pitchers also have varying stamina; as a pitcher gets tired, the ball slows down and is harder to steer. Nolan Ryan and Roger Clemens are two pitchers in the game with the fastest pitches.  Fernando Valenzuela, without a hard fastball, has tremendous movement in both directions with his pitches.  Mike Scott has a sharp and deceptive breaking ball.  The best pitcher is debatable, depending on how they are used by the players.  There is no evidence that fielding abilities correspond to individual players.

The abilities of each player do not necessarily correspond with the statistics shown on the screen when the player comes to bat or takes the mound. These statistics are generally accurate, with many exceptions (see below). They do not change during the course of the game or sequence of games.

A rudimentary box score is displayed during and after the game showing composite statistics for each team. A hit batter is credited with a walk, and anyone reaching on an error gets credited for a hit even as the other team is charged with an error. Conversely, a batter thrown out while trying for extra bases is not credited with a hit.

The infield fly rule is not implemented.

The rosters for the eight teams are fairly accurate if simplified representations of the playoff rosters from their respective years. Each team has 8 starting batters, four bench players, two starting pitchers and two relievers. The player can start any pitcher they like, though the relievers have very low stamina. But if they play consecutive games without resetting the system, any starting pitcher used in the previous game will be unavailable. The player has to wait until the game starts before substituting players with pinch hitters, who can play any position. Pinch runners are not implemented.

Unlike Major League Baseball, R.B.I. Baseball implements the mercy rule—if one team is ahead by ten or more runs after any number of completed innings, the game ends immediately.

Additionally, while the statistics shown on the screen for each player in the original game were reasonably accurate, their playing attributes were not always accurate. For example, George Brett was depicted in-game as a right-handed batter, while the real-life Brett batted left-handed. Also, all real-life switch hitters, such as Tim Raines, were depicted exclusively as left-handed batters.

In Vs. RBI Baseball, the teams are made up of legends from 10 different franchises. These players were statistically represented with their best seasons. A notable exception was that of McGwire, who was included on the Oakland team, and was statistically represented by his potential numbers. In a remarkable display of foresight, he was projected to hit 62 home runs in his best season. In 1998, he set the then-major league record for home runs in a season with 70.

From the second game onward in the original R.B.I. Baseball series, all of the (then) 26 (later 28) Major League Baseball teams were featured; however, these later games also did not have a full MLB license, so the teams were only identified by their cities (however, they still had real player names as they had the MLBPA license). Beginning with the third game in the series, some playoff teams of the recent past were featured, which also include the rosters of those teams in the years that they qualified.

Games

Original series

Modern series

Reception
Most every edition of R.B.I. Baseball typically received "generally unfavorable reviews" from critics starting with its 2014 reboot, according to review aggregator Metacritic. R.B.I. Baseball 19 received "mixed or average reviews".

IGN called R.B.I. Baseball 14 and 15 "bad". Forbes gave bad reviews to 16, 17, and 18. 18 was criticized for its animation and collision detection. Polygon called R.B.I. Baseball 18 "primitive".

R.B.I. Baseball 18 was nominated for "Sports Game" and "Strategy/Simulation Game" at the 2019 Webby Awards.

References

External links

Video game franchises introduced in 1987
Baseball video games
Amiga games
Android (operating system) games
Appaloosa Interactive games
Commodore 64 games
Arcade video games
Atari ST games
Domark games
Family Stadium and spin-offs
IOS games
Nintendo Entertainment System games
Nintendo Switch games
Nintendo Vs. Series games
PlayChoice-10 games
PlayStation 3 games
PlayStation 4 games
Sega 32X games
Game Gear games
Sega Genesis games
Super Nintendo Entertainment System games
Tengen (company) games
Unauthorized video games
Video games scored by Brad Fuller
Video games developed in the United States
Xbox 360 games
Xbox One games